Bruce Miller may refer to:

Bruce Miller (producer), American television writer and producer
Bruce Miller (politician), politician in Alberta, Canada
Bruce Miller (soil scientist) (1922–2022), New Zealand soil chemist and scientific administrator
Bruce Miller (diplomat) (born 1960), Australian ambassador
Bruce Miller (soccer) (born 1957), retired Canadian soccer player
Bruce Miller (baseball) (born 1947), infielder for the San Francisco Giants baseball team
Bruce Miller (American football) (born 1987), American football fullback
Bruce Granville Miller, professor of anthropology
Bruce Miller (theater director), stage director and producer